Saurav Gurjar (born 26 September 1984) is an Indian professional wrestler and actor. He is currently signed to WWE, where he performs on NXT under the ring name Sanga, as a member of Indus Sher, alongside Veer Mahaan and Jinder Mahal. He is best known for his role as Bhima in the TV show Mahabharat. He is a former National Kickboxing Gold Medalist.

Early life
Gurjar was born on 26 September 1984 and hails from Dabra in Madhya Pradesh. He is a former National Kickboxing Gold medalist.

Professional wrestling career

Ring Ka King (2011–2012)
In December 2011, he took part in Total Nonstop Action Wrestling's India project, Ring Ka King, where he performed under the ring name Deadly Danda. He was a member of Jeff Jarrett's heel stable RDX alongside Abyss, Scott Steiner, Nick Aldis and Sonjay Dutt.

WWE (2018–present)
On 14 January 2018, Gurjar signed a contract with WWE. Gurjar made his first televised appearance as a participant in the Worlds Collide men's battle. On 25 March 2020 episode of NXT, Gurjar and Rinku Singh  attacked Matt Riddle, with Malcolm Bivens seemingly acting as their manager. The following week, Bivens would introduce them as Rinku and Saurav and revealed their team name to be Indus Sher Indus Sher stopped appearing on television in June after Gurjar posted a photo on Instagram of Keith Lee holding both the NXT Championship and the NXT North American Championship which he won and retained respectfully, at NXT's The Great American Bash (2020) which had yet to air at the time the photo was uploaded. 

On 18 January 2022 episode of NXT, Saurav, under the new ring name Sanga, was repackaged as a bodyguard of Grayson Waller. However, on the April 12 edition of NXT, Waller fired Sanga and the following week, Sanga would lose to Waller in a singles match. In October, Sanga reformed Indus Sher with Veer Mahaan, the former Rinku, who had recently returned to NXT.

Championships and Accomplishments

'Ring Ka King
 World Cup of Ring Ka King (2012) - with Scott Steiner, Sir Brutus Magnus, Abyss, and Sonjay Dutt

Acting career
In 2013, Gurjar who started his acting venture and appeared on television. He made his television debut with a serial Mahabharat in which he portrayed the role of Bhim. The show was aired on Star Plus and had run from 2013 to 2014. He then appeared in Sankatmochan Mahabali Hanuman as Ravan and Bali from 2016 to 2017.

He made his debut in films with Brahmastra'' released on 2022.

Filmography

Television

References

External links

 

Indian professional wrestlers
1984 births
Living people
Indian male professional wrestlers
21st-century Indian male actors
People from Gwalior district
21st-century professional wrestlers